San Mango Piemonte is a village and comune in the province of Salerno in the Campania region of southern Italy.

It is an agricultural centre at the foot of the Monti Picentini, founded in 88 BC after the destruction of Picentia by the Romans.

Geography
The village is bordered by Castiglione del Genovesi, Salerno and San Cipriano Picentino

Sports

The village's well-known football team is ASD Temeraria 1957.

References

Cities and towns in Campania